The women's 200 metres event at the 1999 European Athletics U23 Championships was held in Göteborg, Sweden, at Ullevi on 30 and 31 July 1999.

Medalists

Results

Final
31 July
Wind: -0.5 m/s

Heats
30 July
Qualified: first 2 in each heat and 2 best to the Final

Heat 1
Wind: 0.1 m/s

Heat 2
Wind: 0.1 m/s

Heat 3
Wind: 0.9 m/s

Participation
According to an unofficial count, 19 athletes from 13 countries participated in the event.

 (1)
 (1)
 (3)
 (2)
 (2)
 (1)
 (1)
 (1)
 (1)
 (1)
 (1)
 (2)
 (2)

References

200 metres
200 metres at the European Athletics U23 Championships